The Ozark Mountain Daredevils are an American rock band formed in 1972 in Springfield, Missouri. They are most widely known for their singles "If You Wanna Get to Heaven" in 1974 and "Jackie Blue" in 1975.

Bassist Michael "Supe" Granda has also written a book about the band, It Shined.

Name 
According to the book It Shined by Michael Granda, the band name was derived from "Cosmic Corn Cob & His Amazing Ozark Mountain Daredevils", a name that John Dillon came up with at a Kansas City "naming party" after the band was told that the name they had previously been using, "Family Tree", was already taken. The band shortened the name because none of the band members at the time wanted to be called "Cosmic Corn Cob", and they did not want the name to sound similar to the Amazing Rhythm Aces.

Formation and the Family Tree 
In 1971 Randle Chowning formed a band which included himself, Steve Cash, John Dillon, Elizabeth Anderson, Larry Lee, Rick Campanelli, Bill Jones and Michael Granda.

The band recorded a demo at Springfield's Top Talent Studios (soon to be renamed as American Artists) and that demo, containing such early songs as "Rhythm of Joy", found its way to New York music executive John Hammond via the hands of band friend Steve Canaday, co–owner of the New Bijou Theater. In July 1972 Hammond sent a producer, Michael Sunday, to the band's Ruedi-Valley Ranch in Aldrich, Missouri, the house rented from Randle Chowning's Southwest Missouri State University teacher Mrs. Ruedi, where the band rehearsed and where Chowning and his brother Rusty lived. Sunday offered the group $500 to make another demo tape at American Artists but ultimately decided to pass on offering them a contract. Many of the songs on this demo appeared thirteen years later as the record The Lost Cabin Sessions.

The band later sent a tape to the team who managed fellow Missourians Brewer & Shipley, Kansas City's Paul Peterson and Stan Plesser (who also owned the Vanguard, a popular coffee house, and ran their own Good Karma Productions). The pair gave the band a chance and became their managers as well in October 1972. The band then changed their name to the Ozark Mountain Daredevils (see "Name") and saw the departure of Campanelli and Jones along with the addition of Buddy Brayfield, a friend of Granda's, as the piano player. Anderson, though still romantically involved with Dillon, retired from the stage. Campanelli left on his own to pursue a master's degree in music; Jones rejoined the Daredevils briefly later and would continue to appear as a guest player on some of their shows and recording sessions.

1970s with A&M 
The band began playing out in 1972 and 1973. On February 8, 1973, they played at Cowtown Ballroom in Kansas City, Missouri. Later that month, on February 21, they played a concert at Shawnee Mission Northwest High School in Shawnee, Kansas. Two weeks after that, on March 9 and 10, they played at Kiel Opera House in St. Louis and Cowtown Ballroom again, this time with Brewer & Shipley accompanied by Loudon Wainwright III. Performances from both those March shows later turned up on a CD called Archive Alive in 1997.

The group's demo tape eventually caught the attention of A&M Records staff producer David Anderle, who was looking for an Eagles country rock type of band to place on the label. Anderle and the Eagles' first producer, Glyn Johns, flew to Missouri to catch the band's aforementioned performance at Cowtown Ballroom on March 10, 1973. But the band, nervous about Johns and Anderle being in the audience, did not play their best. Later on, Paul Peterson invited the two men back to his place to hear the band give an unplugged performance by candlelight. This time Anderle and Johns were blown away and they were signed to A&M on May 1, 1973, and sent to England to record their first record at Olympic Studios in London with Johns at the helm during that June and July.

The first record, The Ozark Mountain Daredevils (also referred to as "The Quilt Album"), was released in December 1973 and spawned the Top 30 hit "If You Wanna Get to Heaven" in the summer of 1974. The album introduced the band's unique mixture of rock, country, bluegrass and pop to the world and is still the favorite of many of the group's fans.

For the second album, It'll Shine When It Shines (October 1974), Johns and Anderle came to Missouri to record, utilizing a mobile recording truck set up outside of the band's rehearsal home. During the sessions, Johns overheard Larry Lee sitting at a piano playing and singing a song about a mysterious friend of his who sometimes dealt drugs on the side. Johns loved the melody and thought it could be a smash hit if the lyrics were altered to be about a girl and the drug references downplayed. Lee and Cash did as Johns asked and the song, Jackie Blue, became the Daredevils' signature song and a huge hit (No. 3) in the spring of 1975.

The Ozark's third release, The Car Over the Lake Album (September 1975), recorded in Nashville, Tennessee and produced by Anderle alone, featured their old compatriot, Bill Jones, joining them to play and arrange their songs. He also toured with them in 1975–1976. The album sold fairly well but produced no hits.

One reason why the band's fortunes began to falter might have been their reluctance to relocate to Southern California after being asked to do so by A&M co-head Jerry Moss. Another reason was their reluctance to do the constant touring that many of their contemporaries were doing at the time. A further sticking point was the band's unwillingness to try and duplicate their biggest hit, "Jackie Blue", or copy what other groups were doing. As a result, A&M began to lose a bit of their enthusiasm for the act.

Personnel shifts within the group also began to change the chemistry. In the spring of 1976, the band embarked on a tour of Europe. But by the time the exhausted troupe hit Copenhagen, Denmark, for the tour's final stop at Daddy's Dance Hall in early May, they were confounded by a horrible sound mix for their show. An angry Randle Chowning responded by turning up his amplifier all the way which upset the other band members and resulted in a huge shouting match at the end of the night. Upon their return home, Chowning refused to speak to the others or take their calls. Norwegian musician Rune Walle, whom the band had met while on tour in Europe with his band the Flying Norwegians, was then contacted in June to replace him. Walle's first show with the group was at Arrowhead Stadium in Kansas City on July 23, 1976, on a bill that also included the Beach Boys, the Doobie Brothers, Jeff Beck and Firefall. Chowning went on to form his own Randle Chowning Band

That same year, the Daredevils headed west to the Rockies, to Caribou Ranch near Nederland, Colorado, to record their fourth album, which they had originally titled Nuclear Fishing but then changed to Men From Earth after A&M objected. The Nuclear Fishing title was later used up in Canada for a greatest hits album release. Anderle was once again in the producer's chair and Evergreen, Colorado resident Jerry Mills joined the band on mandolin and also served as the group's advance publicist. Another face from the past, Steve Canaday, also came back into the group's life in 1975 as road manager and opening act before joining the band during the making of Men From Earth.

In the fall of 1976, Buddy Brayfield departed to study medicine and Ruell Chappell (vocals, keyboards), from the popular Springfield group Spillwater Junction, came in. But the band's next several releases – Men From Earth (September 1976), Don't Look Down (October 1977, produced by David Kershenbaum, once again at Caribou Ranch) and It's Alive (September 1978) – sold in smaller quantities than their previous records had. Jerry Mills and his mandolin were dropped from the group after It's Alive since the band was performing fewer acoustic numbers in their show by this time.

During the summer of 1978, the Daredevils went out for a short run of shows where they opened for Fleetwood Mac. Granda was not available since he was at home helping his wife with the birth of their second child, so Springfield bassist Larry Van Fleet (from the Randle Chowning Band) sat in for these dates.

On August 26, 1978, the Ozarks appeared at Canada Jam on a large bill that also included Kansas, Atlanta Rhythm Section, the Doobie Brothers, the Commodores and others.

Also in 1978, John Dillon and Steve Cash contributed to an album, White Mansions, which documented life in the Confederacy during the American Civil War. Waylon Jennings, Eric Clapton, Jessi Colter, Bernie Leadon and several other musicians appeared on this record as well.

1978 also had Larry Lee recording a solo album for A&M that was not released.

In September 1978, the group flew to Hollywood to appear on The Midnight Special. But when A&M's Jerry Moss witnessed the inebriated band members race through their set on the show, he decided not to pick up the option on their record deal and the Ozarks found themselves without a home in 1979.

1980s 
By 1979 the group had moved over to Columbia Records and put out the self-titled Ozark Mountain Daredevils in April 1980. This album, recorded in Los Angeles, was produced by famed country rock pioneer producer John Boylan and did not feature Chappell or Canaday, and Walle only contributed slide guitar to a few songs, since Boylan insisted on bringing in session players for a more typical "California country rock laid back sound", which was popular at the time. But country rock's popularity seemed to be on the wane at the dawn of the 1980s as groups such as the Ozarks, Poco and Firefall saw their sales begin to slip away. The album saw the band moving away from country towards a harder rock sound. But it failed to find many takers at the record stores and Columbia dropped the group after only one record.

In 1980 Walle left the Daredevils to be replaced by Springfield guitarist Terry Wilson (who had been playing with Granda in a side project created for fun called the Dog People). Chappell also split in 1980.

In December 1980 Brayfield, Chowning, Jones, Chappell and Walle reunited with the band for two shows, one in Springfield and one in Kansas City. The first was at Hammons Student Center on December 6 and the second, on December 31, occurred at the Uptown Theater in Kansas City. The latter show was later put out on CD (in August 2006) and DVD (in June 2007) as 1980 Reunion Concert: Rhythm And Joy.

Larry Lee left the band and relocated to Nashville, Tennessee, to pursue his own career in 1982, after releasing a solo album, Marooned, that had been recorded in Los Angeles for Columbia and released in March of the same year. He also worked as a songwriter and country producer (for Alabama, Juice Newton and others) and would still play drums on occasion with other acts. In the mid-'80s, he even did a stint with Jimmy Buffett's Coral Reefer Band. After Lee's 1982 departure the group was left a quintet, with Dillon, Cash, Granda, Canaday and Wilson.

Later the same year, there was another major upheaval as Dillon and Cash decided that they'd had enough as well. After some consideration, it was decided that the group would continue with Granda and the returning Randle Chowning leading a new lineup that included Bobby "Lloyd" Hicks (vocals, drums, percussion, ex-Steve Forbert), Joe Terry (vocals, keyboards, from the St. Louis group the Couch Dancers) and Tulsa guitarist Gary Smith. Canaday stayed on and once again became the band's road manager.

This new grouping only lasted about a year and a half before Chowning left again, Hicks took a job with Kerry Cole & the Lefty Brothers and Joe Terry joined a new band, the Morells. At this point, Dillon and Cash agreed to rejoin and Gary Smith stayed around a few months more before relocating to Branson, Missouri, so the mid-1984 Ozarks lineup was: John Dillon, Steve Cash, "Supe" Granda, Steve Canaday and Gary Smith, the latter soon succeeded by Jason LeMasters (guitar), before LeMasters departed to work for Kris Kristofferson and was replaced by Chowning, back for his third stint with the Daredevils.

In 1984 the group's managers, Stan Plesser and Paul Peterson, closed their Good Karma Productions company as the band began to manage and book themselves from this point on.

In 1985 the band followed singer/drummer Larry Lee to Nashville to record a new album produced by Wendy Waldman that, like their 1980 Columbia release, utilized session players. Lee briefly rejoined for this album but there was no interest at all from any of the labels in Nashville in the project. A small French company, Dixiefrog Records, eventually picked up the record and it was released in France as Heart of the Country in 1987. Many of the same songs were released in England in 1989 as Modern History on the Conifer label.

In the meantime, the Daredevils continued on with Morells guitarist Don Clinton Thompson in 1985 after Chowning left yet again during the recording of the aforementioned Nashville album in 1985.

Also released in 1985 were a group of mostly unreleased tracks (the aforementioned demos that they had recorded for Michael Sunday and John Hammond back on July 6 & 7, 1972) that appeared on Varèse Sarabande Records as The Lost Cabin Sessions. An expanded version of this release, with additional songs, was later released on CD.

During the spring of 1988, the people at Dixiefrog Records in France brought the Daredevils over to play there and other European dates in support of Heart of the Country that had recently been released there.

There were more personnel changes as Canaday, who had been managing the group as well as playing drums, ran afoul of some marriage difficulties and some rough waters with the group's business affairs and decided to leave to move to Nashville in 1988 to work as tour manager for Lee Roy Parnell, Tammy Wynette and Marshall Chapman; he was briefly succeeded on drums by the band's sound man, Rick "Lumpy" Davidson, who previously had sometimes joined the group onstage playing washboard.

At the end of 1989, Thompson quit to reform his old band, the Skeletons, and Davidson moved to Branson to take a job as sound mixer at Ray Stevens' theater. In 1990 guitarist Bill Brown (from Supe's side band Supe & the Sandwiches) and Morells drummer Ron "Rongo" Gremp came aboard. The band continued their now-limited touring.

1990s 
A 1990 release, Now Hear This!, was put out on cassette tape only.

In 1991 Granda, like Lee and Canaday before him, decided to uproot himself and settle in Nashville where he peddled his songs, searched for a deal for his side band, Supe & the Sandwiches, and became involved in other projects, including a stint as bass player in Michael Clarke's Byrds. In the summer of 1992, the Daredevils resumed their ever-dwindling schedule of gigs.

Kelly O'Shea from the Titanic Blues Band sometimes filled in for Brown on lead guitar from 1992 to 1994.

In 1996 the Ozarks were approached by their former manager, Stan Plesser, to re-record some of their best-known songs for a company called Eclipse Records. This was recorded in Nashville with producer Bob Wright with only Dillon, Cash and Granda (Larry Lee and Steve Canaday guested on backup vocals) playing on this project accompanied by session players. The CD was titled Jackie Blue and appeared in March 1997 as a budget product sold mostly at truck stops. This CD has been re-released many times since then under different titles, including Our Most Dangerous Stunts in June 2006.

New Era Productions, a company formed by an old Springfield buddy of the group's, Benny Smith, agreed to fund another album of brand new material in 1996, 13. This was recorded in their hometown of Springfield and mixed mostly in Nashville by Larry Lee, who played and sang on it as well. Chowning also contributed to the album, but after the band was unable to secure a major label release, he had himself removed from it. 13 was released in June 1997. Also that year came Archive Alive, a CD containing performances from their March 1973 shows at Cowtown Ballroom in Kansas City and Kiel Opera House in St Louis.

On September 25, 1999, Steve Canaday was killed, aged 55, when the small plane he was traveling in crashed in Nashville, Tennessee while he was working as an aerial photographer.

2000s 
On July 23, 2004, guitarist Bill Brown died of smoke inhalation in a house fire in Springfield that also took the life of another popular Springfield guitarist, Don Shipps (from Supe's side band, Supe & the Sandwiches, the Titanic Blues Band and earlier Granny's Bathwater). On October 16 of this same year, the group and several other Springfield bands appeared at the Abou Ben Adhem Shrine Mosque in a memorial show for Brown and benefit for his family.

Since that time the band has gone into semi-retirement but usually emerges each year to play shows. The 2004 lineup contained Dillon, Cash, "Supe", Ron Gremp and Dave Painter (who joined for the 2004 Shrine Mosque show). Beginning with a series of shows in May 2007 at Gillioz Theater in Springfield, Kelly Brown joined as the group's new keyboardist. These shows were recorded for a 2008 DVD release called Revival (Live at the Gillioz) .

Starting in 2005, Lee and Chowning re-teamed in a new group, Beyond Reach, that formed in Nashville but has since moved its base back to the two men's hometown of Springfield, Missouri. In 2006 and 2007 Lee and Chowning began appearing as special guests at some of the Daredevils shows but haven't done so in recent years due to personal differences. It appears that they're no longer interested in playing with the Daredevils, nor are the Daredevils interested in having them.

Concurrently, also in 2005 Steve Cash wrote a science fiction trilogy titled The Meq published by Del Rey Books.

2010s 

A brand new live album by the Daredevils, a two-disc set featuring 21 tracks, including old favorites, rare songs and a couple of new ones, titled Alive & Wild, was made available in October 2011. This was taken from shows performed at Wildwood Springs Lodge in Steelville, Missouri in November 2010. The band line up for these shows included: John Dillon, Steve Cash, Michael "Supe" Granda, Ron Gremp, Dave Painter, Kelly Brown, Bill Jones, Ruell Chappell (who'd returned in 2008, now on percussion and vocals) and Nick Sibley (guitar, mandolin, harmonica, backing vocals), a former bandmate of Chappell's. From 2010 to 2019, the band continued to make concert appearances with this nine piece lineup, occasionally joined (from 2012 on) on stage by violinist/cellist/guitarist/singer-songwriter Molly Healey, who became a permanent member in 2014.

Former early band member Buddy Brayfield, now Dr. Sam Brayfield, is a family practice, hospice and palliative care physician in Osage Beach, Missouri and plays with a local band Buddy and the Notes. For the first time since 1980, Brayfield rejoined the group for a reunion concert at Gillioz Theater in September 2010 that included four of the original six members. Brayfield indicated that he decided to play in the Missouri concert since his children had never seen him play with the group.

Bobby "Lloyd" Hicks, the group's 1982 drummer, died on February 19, 2017, after suffering extensive lung damage stemming from double pneumonia, just three weeks shy of his 70th birthday.

In early 2018, the band announced on their Facebook page the release of a new album, Off The Beaten Path, as a self release.

On May 17, 2019, the band self released Heaven 20/20, a 7 track EP featuring five new songs, one live song and a re-recording of "If You Want To Get To Heaven." It would be the last album to feature co-founder Steve Cash before his death later that year.

Steve Cash died on October 13, 2019, at age 73 after an extended illness.

2020s 
The Ozark Mountain Daredevils and Major Brands, the largest Missouri based distributor of premium alcohol and non-alcohol beverages announced production of Ozark Dry Gin that will exclusively be sold to retailers and restaurateurs in Missouri.

The band has been very active on their Facebook account posting stories, pictures, news, and videos. One post from December 2021 announced a project celebrating the bands 50th anniversary in 2022, the publication of The Ozark Mountain Daredevils on Record: A Narrative Discography.

Band bassist Michael "Supe" Granda won $9,500 on the December 24, 2021, episode of Wheel of Fortune but did not win his game on that episode.

To further mark their 50th anniversary, the band announced a return to their hometown to perform three gigs at The Landers Theatre (on March 17–19, 2022), where they'd played their first gig in 1972 still under the name "Family Tree".

On May 17, 2022, the group went to Nashville to make their Grand Ole Opry debut as part of their Time Warp Tour, celebrating their Fiftieth Year Anniversary.  And on June 30 their documentary, Ozark Mountain Daredevils Backstage, debuted on PBS Television.

Members 
(Founding members listed in bold)

Current members 
 Mike 'Supe' Granda – bass, mandolin, vocals (1972-present)
 John Dillon – guitar, mandolin, fiddle, dulcimer, autoharp, keyboards, vocals (1972–1982, 1984-present)
 Bill Jones – woodwinds, horns (1974–1976, 2010-present)
 Ruell Chappell – keyboards, percussion, vocals (1976–1980, 2008-present)
 Ron 'Rongo' Gremp – drums (1990-present)
 Dave Painter – lead guitar, vocals (2004-present)
 Kelly Brown – keyboards, vocals (2007-present)
 Nick Sibley – rhythm guitar, mandolin, vocals (2010-present)
 Molly Healey – fiddle, vocals (2014-present)

Former members 
Randle Chowning – lead guitar, harmonica, vocals (1972–1976, 1982–1984, 1984–1985)
 Larry Lee – drums, percussion, keyboards, guitar, vocals (1972–1982, 1985)
Steve Cash – harmonica, percussion, vocals (1970–1982, 1984–2019, his death)
 Buddy Brayfield – keyboards, oboe, backing vocals (1972–1976)
 Jerry Mills – mandolin (1976–1978)
 Rune Walle – lead guitar, banjo, vocals (1976–1980)
 Joe Terry – keyboards, vocals (1982–1984)
 Bobby 'Lloyd' Hicks – drums (1982–1984) (died 2017)
 Terry Wilson – lead guitar, vocals (1980–1982)
 Jason LeMasters – lead guitar (1984)
 Gary Smith – rhythm guitar, vocals (1982–1984)
 Steve Canaday – guitar, drums, vocals (1976–1982, 1984–1988) (died 1999)
 Don Clinton Thompson – lead guitar, vocals (1985–1989)
 Rick 'Lumpy' Davidson – drums (1988–1989)
 Bill Brown – lead guitar, vocals (1990–2004, his death)

Member Timeline

Discography

Official US studio albums

Official US live albums

Official US compilation albums

European compilation albums

Live DVDs

Singles

References

External links 
 Official website
 

Rock music groups from Missouri
American southern rock musical groups
American country rock groups
Musical groups from Missouri
Musical groups established in 1972
A&M Records artists